Sabah Peace Party or  (SPP) is a Sabah-based-opposition party in Malaysia formed after the 2013 Malaysian general election. Following its establishment, the party declare it is not on the side of either the ruling Barisan Nasional (BN) or the opposition then. The multi-racial party was formed and led by Berman Angkap, who is also both Federated Sabah People's Front (BERSEKUTU) and Sabah People's Front (SPF) former founding presidents, had declared it represents the rights and interests of the people and the state of Sabah.

See also
Politics of Malaysia
List of political parties in Malaysia

References 

Political parties in Sabah
2013 establishments in Malaysia
Political parties established in 2013